Geoffrey Bruce may refer to:

 Geoffrey Bruce (Indian Army officer) (1896–1972), British army officer and Everest mountaineer
 Geoffrey Franklin Bruce, Canadian diplomat